Georgi Georgiev Dimitrov (Bulgarian: Георги Георгиeв Димитров; 14 January 1959 – 8 May 2021) was a Bulgarian professional footballer who played as a centre-back.

Dimitrov represented Bulgaria on 77 occasions between 1978 and 1988, scoring 7 goals. He captained his country 56 times including at the 1986 FIFA World Cup.

Honours

Club
CSKA Sofia
 A Group: 1979–80, 1980–81, 1981–82, 1982–83, 1988–89
 Bulgarian Cup: 1983, 1985, 1989
 Cup of the Soviet Army: 1985, 1986, 1989

Individual
 Bulgarian Footballer of the Year: 1985

References

External links
 

1959 births
2021 deaths
People from Stara Zagora Province
Bulgarian footballers
Association football defenders
Bulgaria international footballers
1986 FIFA World Cup players
PFC Beroe Stara Zagora players
PFC CSKA Sofia players
AS Saint-Étienne players
PFC Slavia Sofia players
First Professional Football League (Bulgaria) players
Ligue 1 players
Bulgarian football managers
Bulgarian expatriate footballers
Expatriate footballers in France
Bulgarian expatriate sportspeople in France